Yonabaru Airfield or NAB Yonabaru is a former World War II airfield on the Pacific coast of Okinawa. The base was disestablished on 30 June 1947.

History

World War II
Yonabaru Airfield was originally established by the Imperial Japanese Army Air Force. The airfield was captured on 15 May 1945 during Battle of Okinawa. The 145th Naval Construction Battalion (Seebees) began to improve the airfield for service as a patrol/bomber airstrip in June once the fighting had moved further south. On 15 August 1945 the base with its  runway was ready for use by US Navy aircraft.

VPB-124 operating PB-4Ys was based at Yonabaru from 10 August until 12 December 1945.

The base was severely damaged by Typhoon Louise on 9 October 1945.

Postwar
On 27 February 1957, the Deputy Governor announced that the Yonabaru airfield site would be used as a Marine helicopter installation.

See also
Awase Airfield
Chimu Airfield
Naval Base Okinawa

References

External links
 Photos of the base in 1945-6

Aviation in Japan
Airfields of the United States Navy
Military installations closed in 1947
Closed installations of the United States Navy